Freddie Ray Jones Jr. (born September 16, 1974) is a former tight end in the National Football League. Jones was drafted by the San Diego Chargers with their 2nd round pick (45th overall) in the 1997 NFL Draft. Jones became one of the best tight ends in the league in his 5 years with the Chargers. On November 4, 2001, he caught Drew Brees's first touchdown pass. Before the 2002 season he signed with the Arizona Cardinals, where he played for 3 years. He then signed with the Carolina Panthers before the 2005 season, but never played. On August 7, 2005, he announced his retirement at the age of 30, with 404 receptions for 4232 yards and 22 touchdowns.

1974 births
Living people
People from Cheverly, Maryland
American football tight ends
North Carolina Tar Heels football players
San Diego Chargers players
Arizona Cardinals players
Players of American football from Maryland